The thirteenth season of the American television medical drama Grey's Anatomy premiered on September 22, 2016, in the United States on the American Broadcasting Company (ABC), and consisted of 24 episodes. The season was ordered on March 3, 2016, along with ABC's other shows. The season is produced by ABC Studios, in association with Shondaland Production Company and The Mark Gordon Company; the showrunners being William Harper and Stacy McKee.

The bulk of the season revolves around the residency program's teaching operation being analyzed and revamped, with the help of new residency program leader and education consultant Eliza Minnick, portrayed by Marika Dominczyk. The revamp causes tension and divides the staff who disapprove of these new methods. Other plots include the fallout of Alex Karev beating up Andrew DeLuca and his impending trial, Jo Wilson's true identity and past as well as Amelia's trauma over having children.    

This season was the first not to feature Sara Ramirez as Dr. Callie Torres since her introduction in the second season, following her departure at the conclusion of the previous season. 

On February 10, 2017, ABC renewed Grey's Anatomy for a fourteenth season.

Episodes

The number in the "No. overall" column refers to the episode's number within the overall series, whereas the number in the "No. in season" column refers to the episode's number within this particular season. "U.S. viewers in millions" refers to the number of Americans in millions who watched the episodes live. Each episode of this season is named after a song.

Cast and characters

Main 
 Ellen Pompeo as Dr. Meredith Grey
 Justin Chambers as Dr. Alex Karev
 Chandra Wilson as Dr. Miranda Bailey
 James Pickens Jr. as Dr. Richard Webber
 Kevin McKidd as Dr. Owen Hunt
 Jessica Capshaw as Dr. Arizona Robbins
 Sarah Drew as Dr. April Kepner
 Jesse Williams as Dr. Jackson Avery
 Caterina Scorsone as Dr. Amelia Shepherd
 Camilla Luddington as Dr. Jo Wilson
 Jerrika Hinton as Dr. Stephanie Edwards
 Kelly McCreary as Dr. Maggie Pierce
 Jason George as Dr. Ben Warren
 Martin Henderson as Dr. Nathan Riggs
 Giacomo Gianniotti as Dr. Andrew DeLuca

Recurring 
 Tessa Ferrer as Dr. Leah Murphy
 Joe Adler as Dr. Isaac Cross
 Debbie Allen as Dr. Catherine Avery
 Vivian Nixon as Dr. Hannah Brody
 LaTanya Richardson Jackson as Diane Pierce
 Marika Dominczyk as Dr. Eliza Minnick

Notable guests 
 Sumalee Montano as Lena McCallister
 Kimberly Quinn as Reena Thompson
 Rusty Schwimmer as Patricia Phillips
 Jen Lilley as Kara Fisher
 Vicki Davis as Morgan Fisher
 Betsy Baker as Barbara Davis
 Ravi Patel as Timir Dhar
 Bridget Regan as Dr. Megan Hunt
 Wallace Langham as Dr. Steve Corridan 
 Anjul Nigam as Dr. Raj Sen 
 K Callan as Janis 
 Matthew Alan as David Fisher 
 June Squibb as Elsie Clatch
 Hal Holbrook as Lewis Clatch
 Eric Roberts as Robert Avery
 Matthew Morrison as Dr. Paul Stadler

Production

Development 
Grey's Anatomy was renewed for a 13th season by ABC on March 3, 2016. TVLine announced that the 13th season will begin airing on September 22, 2016. Production began on May 25, 2016, when Rhimes announced on Twitter that the writers were in full swing mapping the 13th season. Production began on July 21, 2016, with prepping for the season officially starting on July 28, 2016. The table read for the premiere was on July 22, 2016. Filming for the season began on August 1, 2016, with Shonda Rhimes tweeting that the crew were filming the 270th episode of the series, the season premiere. A promotional poster for the season was released on August 2, 2016, portraying Dr. Meredith Grey in Seattle, for which the series is located. The poster started speculation of its meaning towards the storyline for the 13th season. However Rhimes denied the speculation about the poster on Twitter as she said "For anyone trying to interpret the "meaning" of the new Grey's Anatomy poster design: it means ABC designs really cool posters."

The remaining fall schedule for ABC was announced on October 22, 2016, where it was announced that Grey's Anatomy would air nine episodes in the fall, rather than eight episode the previous two seasons has done, with the fall finale to air on November 17, 2016, just like the rest of ABC's primetime thursday-lineup Notorious and How to Get Away with Murder, which was the same last year. The remaining 15 episodes will air after the winter break beginning airing on January 26, 2017.

Writing 
In an interview with TV Guide, Kelly McCreary said that the 13th season would be focusing heavily on the characters that have been on the show since the first season; Dr. Meredith Grey, Dr. Alex Karev, Dr. Miranda Bailey and Dr. Richard Webber. McCreary went more into the storyline as she commented that "After such a long period of time and so many new people coming in and out, they remain the foundational characters of the show. We're gonna be spending some more time with them to check in with where they are." In another interview, McCreary talked about the love-triangle drama that will unfold between Meredith, Nathan and Maggie, to which she commented on how "Maggie's ego will probably be wounded." 

Caterina Scorsone said that Amelia would be "the middle-person between her sisters should the Nathan-news come out." She confirmed that the season premiere will pick up right after where the finale ended and that Justin Chambers' character Alex and his storyline with girlfriend Jo would play a bigger part of the premiere, in addition that Amelia and Kevin McKidd's character Owen would not be much in the premiere. Jessica Capshaw will not be in the first 2 episodes, confirmed by Rhimes, because of wanting to be a little more with her kids. Rhimes reported that Capshaw's character Dr. Arizona Robbins will have a new love-interest.

Casting 
At the end of the twelfth season, the cast's contracts had expired after previously renewing them at the end of the tenth season of Grey's Anatomy. Ellen Pompeo and Patrick Dempsey renewed their contracts for another 2 seasons (seasons 11 and 12) on January 23, 2014, but Dempsey later left the series at the end of the eleventh season. The rest of the 6 original cast mates, Justin Chambers, Chandra Wilson and James Pickens Jr., excluding Sandra Oh, renewed their contracts on May 26, 2014, as Drs. Alex Karev, Miranda Bailey, and Richard Webber, respectively, for the eleventh and twelfth season. Sara Ramirez also renewed her contract for another 2 seasons as Dr. Callie Torres.

On June 28, 2015, before the twelfth season had begun airing, it was announced that Jessica Capshaw, whose contract expired after season 11, had renewed her contract for another 3 seasons as Dr. Arizona Robbins. That meant that her character would be staying on the show through seasons 13 and 14. Kevin McKidd had previously said that he was in negotiations to renew his contract after the twelfth season on January 9, 2016. After the season finale, McKidd confirmed that he would be back for the 13th season. Justin Chambers announced on March 11, 2016 that he had renewed his contract and will be playing Dr. Alex Karev in the 13th season. The Hollywood Reporter reported on May 4, 2016, that the original cast were all negotiating new contracts. After the finale, Pompeo said that she would be returning in the next season, which was officially confirmed by Deadline on June 1, 2016. Series-veteran Sara Ramirez announced after the finale that they would not be returning for season 13 as Dr. Callie Torres, after the character left for New York to be with her girlfriend Dr. Penny Blake. Thus, this will be the first season since her introduction in season 2 in which Dr. Callie Torres, portrayed by Sara Ramirez, is not included in the main cast of characters. On June 10, 2016, it was officially announced that the rest of the cast members whose contracts expired after the twelfth season, Chandra Wilson, James Pickens Jr. and Kevin McKidd, will return for the next season. 

On September 28, 2016, it was announced that the Days of Our Lives alum Jen Lilley would appear in the third episode, playing Kara. Bridget Regan announced on her Instagram account that she would be appearing in the eighth episode "The Room Where It Happens". It was reported that Tessa Ferrer would be reprising her role as Dr. Leah Murphy in a recurring role for the 13th season. On October 17, 2016, ABC confirmed that Marika Dominczyk had been cast in a guest stint as Eliza Minnick. On January 31, 2017, it was announced that Jerrika Hinton would be departing the series-regular cast this season.

Ratings

Live + SD ratings

Live + 7 Day (DVR) ratings

DVD release

References 

2016 American television seasons
2017 American television seasons
Grey's Anatomy seasons